Face Mountain is a  mountain summit located in the Boundary Ranges of the Coast Mountains, in the U.S. state of Alaska. This geographic feature was named "Parsons Peak" in 1897 by the U.S. Coast and Geodetic Survey, and has had variant names "Gnome Mountain", and "The Sphinx" used locally to describe a face in the rock. The mountain's present name and summit location was officially adopted in 1985 by the U.S. Board on Geographic Names, however USGS maps still show the old name, Parsons Peak, as the summit. Precipitation runoff from the mountain drains into tributaries of Taiya Inlet.

Climate

Based on the Köppen climate classification, Face Mountain has a subarctic climate with cold, snowy winters, and cool summers. Weather systems coming off the Gulf of Alaska are forced upwards by the Coast Mountains (orographic lift), causing heavy precipitation in the form of rainfall and snowfall. Temperatures can drop below −20 °C with wind chill factors below −30 °C. This climate supports a glacier north of the summit. The months May through July offer the most favorable weather for viewing or climbing Face Mountain.

See also

List of mountain peaks of Alaska
Geography of Alaska
Etymology and the Mythical Stone Woman

References

External links
 Face Mountain: weather forecast
 Face Mountain: Flickr photo

Mountains of Alaska
Boundary Ranges